Big Law: Deputy Butterbean is an American reality show that began on August 8, 2011 on Investigation Discovery and follows a former heavyweight boxer, Eric "Butterbean" Esch, who now is a deputy sheriff in Walker County, Alabama.

Characters

Main characters
 Eric "Butterbean" Esch
 Adam Hadder
Steve Smith	
Chuck Tidwell	
Silas Madison	
Mitch Jones	
David Cornelius	
Richard Thomas
Ed Leslie
Tamika Madison
David Mize
Dennis Davis		
Grace Esch	
Jennifer Roberts
Stephanie Herron
Herbert Schwertner	
Adam Esch
Philip Windham	
Anthony Harris	
Greg Dickerson	
Libby Esch
Kimmon Gober	
Whitley McCollum	
Kevin Williams

Episodes

Season 1 (2011)

References

External links
 
 

2011 American television series debuts
2011 American television series endings
2010s American reality television series
2010s American crime television series
2010s American documentary television series
2010s American police procedural television series
English-language television shows
Investigation Discovery original programming
Television shows set in Alabama